Cleopatra africana is a species of freshwater snails with an operculum, aquatic gastropod molluscs in the family Paludomidae.

This species is found in Kenya and Tanzania. Its natural habitats are rivers and swamps.

References

Paludomidae
Gastropods described in 1878
Taxonomy articles created by Polbot